Tom Gjelten  is the Religion and Belief Correspondent for National Public Radio (NPR) news. Gjelten has worked for NPR since 1982, when he joined the organization as a labor and education reporter. More recently he has covered diplomatic and national security issues, based at NPR's headquarters in Washington, D.C.  He is a member of the Council on Foreign Relations.

Gjelten and his colleagues at NPR received a Peabody Award in 2004 for "The War in Iraq".

Early life and education 
Gjelten is a graduate of the University of Minnesota and began his professional career as a public school teacher at the North Haven Community School, North Haven, Maine, and as a freelance writer.

Family
Gjelten resides in Arlington, Virginia, with his wife, Martha Raddatz, the Chief Global Affairs Correspondent for ABC News.

Works
 A Nation of Nations: A Great American Immigration Story (Simon & Schuster, 2015),   Bacardi and the Long Fight for Cuba: The Biography of a Cause (Viking, 2008) 
 Professionalism in War Reporting: A Correspondent's View (Carnegie Corporation, 1998)  ASIN B0006FCMB4
 Sarajevo Daily: A City and Its Newspaper Under Siege (HarperCollins, 1995) 
 Contributor to Crimes of War: What the Public Should Know'' (W. W. Norton, 1999. Revised (2.0) 2007)

References

External links

Tom Gjelten biography at NPR.org

Living people
American radio reporters and correspondents
American male journalists
American war correspondents
American military writers
American political writers
NPR personalities
University of Minnesota alumni
People from Arlington County, Virginia
Place of birth missing (living people)
1948 births
Journalists from Virginia
People from North Haven, Maine
20th-century American journalists